is a Japanese badminton player. She was born in Shiogama city, in Miyagi prefecture, and graduated from St. Ursula High School. She is now a sophomore at the School of Social Sciences. She won the first prize of the inter-high school athletic meet when she was a second grade high school student, and the next year, she won the all-Japan second prize. She joined the Unisys badminton team in 2008, and was part of the Japanese team which played in the World Ladies' Championship (Uber Cup) and other worldwide tournaments.

Achievements

BWF Grand Prix 
The BWF Grand Prix had two levels, the Grand Prix and Grand Prix Gold. It was a series of badminton tournaments sanctioned by the Badminton World Federation (BWF) and played between 2007 and 2017.

Women's singles

  BWF Grand Prix Gold tournament
  BWF Grand Prix tournament

BWF International Challenge/Series 
Women's singles

  BWF International Challenge tournament
  BWF International Series tournament

References

External links 
 

1985 births
Living people
People from Shiogama, Miyagi
Sportspeople from Miyagi Prefecture
Japanese female badminton players
21st-century Japanese women